Xoom may refer to:

 Motorola Xoom, an Android-based tablet computer by Motorola
 Xoom (web hosting), an early dot-com that primarily provided free unlimited space web hosting
 Xoom Corporation, a San Francisco–based digital money transfer company

See also
 Zoom (disambiguation)